Zeki Gülay (born 15 August 1972 in Istanbul, Turkey) is a former Turkish basketball player. He mostly played for Fenerbahçe in his career. The center is 2.06 m tall and 129 kg weight and wore #14.

Zeki Gülay was the team captain of Fenerbahçe between 2003 and 2006.

Career highlights
 1994 Turkish President's Cup with Fenerbahçe
 1999 Turkish Basketball Second League Champion with Vestel
 2007 Turkish Basketball League Champion with Fenerbahçe

External links
TBLStat.net Profile
TurkSports.Net Profile

1972 births
Living people
Turkish men's basketball players
Fenerbahçe men's basketball players
Alpella basketball players
TED Ankara Kolejliler players
Türk Telekom B.K. players